The Standard Flying Sixteen/Flying Twenty is an automobile produced by the British Standard Motor Company from October 1935 to 1939. It, along with most of the other Flying Standard models, were announced in October 1935. A standard is a flag and the reference to flying standards is to flying flags as well as to the airstream design of the cars. The Flying Sixteen was discontinued during 1937 and its place in the lineup taken by the four-cylinder Flying Fourteen.

Bodies

The Flying Sixteen/Twenty was commonly a four-door, five-seat saloon with a gently tapering body and a split rear windshield, but other designs were also available. The Flying series used streamlined bodywork, with bodywork (from the a-pillar and back) shared between the Flying Twelve, Flying Sixteen, and Flying Twenty. The front end was different, and wheelbases differed to accommodate the various engines. The Sixteen sat on a  wheelbase, while Flying Twenty buyers could choose between  wheelbases.

The standard, fastback body was designed under direction of Arthur Ballard and was built by Briggs Motor Bodies. Being of a somewhat bulbous appearance, the design is often called a "beetle-back." In addition to this, coachbuilders Avon also offered their "Waymaker" design - a more rakish, lower slung, four-door touring sedan - until their bankruptcy in late 1937. The conventional shield-shaped radiator casing was replaced by a chromed vertically-barred "fencer's mask" grille late in 1937 for the 1938 model year. This also brought with it a model name change, becoming the Flying Twenty 20A. For the 1939 model year, the "torpedo" (fastback) design was changed to a notchback look, becoming the 20CA in the process. While production reportedly ended in 1939, the Flying Twenty remained in price lists into 1940.

Technical
The large Flying Standards used semi-elliptic leaf springs all around, while the steering box was a bishop cam and lever unit. Unusual for the time was the telescopically adjustable steering wheel. Cable-operated (by hand or foot) Bendix "Duo-Servo" brake system operating cast-iron alloy drum brakes was fitted. The four-speed manual had synchromesh on the top three gears (standard for all of the Flying Standards), transmitting power via a needle-bearing propellor shaft to a half-floating rear axle with a spiral bevel final drive. The different engines and wheelbases all received different final gear ratios, reflecting their intended usage.

The smaller engine produces  at 4,000 rpm, while the larger unit has  on tap at 3,800 rpm. Claimed top speeds for the regular-bodied versions are  respectively.

SS
The Sixteen's and Twenty's engine and transmission were used by the SS 1, predecessors to the SS Jaguar 100 and Jaguar Cars. Because of this, nearly all Flying Sixteen and Flying Twentys have been used to create much more valuable SS replicas. There is reportedly only one remaining Flying Sixteen still with the original engine.

References

External links
Standard Motor Club

Flying Sixteen
Cars introduced in 1936
Rear-wheel-drive vehicles
Sedans
Coupés